Soft Touch is the third studio album by guitarist Brian Tarquin, released in May 1999 on Instinct records. Tarquin recorded Soft Touch in London once again with producer Ernie McKone, bass player from the UK acid jazz band Galliano. Once the tracks were all recorded, Instinct didn't want to keep the live playing on the album. This was due mainly because one of the A&R people attended a Radio & Records conference, and had noted that radio was playing programmed grooves. So two other producers Tony Campbell and Chris Ingram were brought in to program the songs and re-record everything. Despite the setbacks, this was another commercially successful album as Smooth Jazz radio embraced the featured single, Darlin Darlin Baby, originally recorded by The O'Jays. Another single from the album, Tangled Web, was a very big radio hit as well, becoming #1 in the New York City market on CD101.9 as well as reaching # 9 nationwide on the Smooth Jazz radio charts. Tarquin also covered another Jeff Beck song, You Know What I Mean.

In lieu of the experience, Tarquin came away from the recording very discourage. The indecisiveness of the record company switching between three different producers, became a frustrating ordeal. Instinct was becoming too concerned with radio approval and less with the actual music. This period planted seeds for the future musical endeavors Tarquin would under take in the coming years.

Track listing

Personnel
Brian Tarquin – guitars
Chris Ingram – keyboard, drum programming 
Tony Campbell – drum programming, bass, keyboard 
Jim Carmichael – drums 
Crispen Taylor – drums
Dave John-Baptiste – saxophone, flute
Toby Baker – Fender Rhodes, clave, piano
Guy Fortt – vocals
Connor Smith – percussion
Damon Brown – trumpet
Phil Brown – saxophone
Ernie McKone – bass
Cliff Lyons– saxophone 
Jacko Peake – saxophone
Pat Lavery – bass

References

External links
 
 
 
 

1999 albums
Brian Tarquin albums
Instinct Records albums